The Texas Ballet Theater was founded by Margo Dean in 1961 as the Fort Worth Ballet Association, in Fort Worth, Texas. At the invitation of Dean, Fernando Schaffenburg was invited to direct the company the following year. It became a fully professional ballet company in 1985. In 1988, after the demise of Dallas Ballet, the company began adding performances of The Nutcracker in Dallas in a business partnership with The Dallas Opera, producing Nutcracker performances in The Music Hall and using The Dallas Opera Orchestra.

Fort Worth Ballet became the Fort Worth Dallas Ballet in 1994 when The Dallas Supporters of FWDB, a separate 501(c)3 corporation with its own board of directors, was established in Dallas. The Dallas Supporters' responsibility was primarily to raise contributed funds so that Fort Worth Dallas Ballet could perform a full season in Dallas in the Music Hall at Fair Park. A detailed joint venture agreement was established between the two organizations. FWDB – the Fort Worth organization – remained the primary employer and producing entity. All dancers, production staff and most administrative staff were employees of FWDB. The Dallas Supporters hired a small administrative staff. Each season, FWDB and The Dallas Supporters would negotiate an agreement outlining which and how many productions would occur in Dallas.

The two organizations operated under this two-corporation, two-board structure for nine seasons. In 2001, the Dallas Supporters were not able to raise the funds needed to produce the Ballet's Dallas season, forcing FWDB to cancel productions planned in Dallas for early 2002; one Fort Worth production was also cancelled. This occurred during a season when FWDB had no permanent artistic director. Bruce Marks was serving as artistic advisor and Bruce Simpson as Ballet-Master-in-Chief.

Over the 2002–2003 season, an agreement to merge the two corporations and their boards was created. The resulting organization was then renamed Texas Ballet Theater in 2003.

Texas Ballet Theater, currently under artistic director of Ben Stevenson, O.B.E. is a resident company of Nancy Lee and Perry R. Bass Performance Hall in Fort Worth and the Margot and Bill Winspear Opera House at the  AT&T Performing Arts Center in Dallas.

Artistic staff
As of February 2019:

 Ben Stevenson, O.B.E. - Artistic Director 	
 Tim O'Keefe - Associate Artistic Director
 Li Anlin - Assistant Artistic Director
 Anna Donovan - Principal Ballet Master

Company dancers
As of May 2010:

Dancers

 Paul Adams
 Adam Boreland
 Henry Winn
 Valentin Batista
 Robin Bangert
 Max Caro
 Katelyn Clenaghan
 Carl Coomer
 Heather Kotelenets
 Jaclyn Gill
 Jennifer Hooper
 Kelly Kristen Irvine
 Carolyn Judson
 Lisa Kaczmarek
 Angela Kenny
 Thomas Kilps
 Alexander Kotelenets
 Michelle LeBoeuf
 Lainey Logan
 Betsy McBride
 Leticia Oliveira
 Lucas Priolo
 Danny Ryan
 Victoria Simo
 Philip Slocki
 Eddy Tovar
 Mark Troxler
 Joamanuel Velazquez
 Peter Zweifel
 Simon Wexler
Havilah Sprunk

Apprentices

 Dustin Geradine
 Paige Nyman
 Andrew Hellerick
 Morgan Stinnett
 Kaitlyn Potts
 Drake Humphreys

Trainees

 Julianna Bicki
 Ali Paige Block
Nicole Von Enck
 Amy Hollinger
 Emma Pressman
 Allisyn Hsieh

Directors
Artistic Directors

Margo Dean 1961-1964
Fernando Schaffenburg, 1964-
Anthony Salatino, 1982-1985
Nanette Glushak and Michel Rahn, 1985-1987
Paul Mejia, 1987-1998
Ben Houk, 1998-2001
Bruce Marks, Artistic Advisor; Bruce Simpson, Ballet-Master-in-Chief, 2001-2002 (interim leadership)
Ben Stevenson, Artistic Advisor, Tim O'Keefe, Ballet Master, 2002-2003 (interim leadership)
Ben Stevenson, 2003 to present

Executive Directors

Tom Adams
Mark Denton, 1988-1990
David Mallette, 1990-2005
Gary Wortley, 2005
John Toohey, 2006-2008
Margo McCann, Managing Director, 2008–2014
Terri Sexton, 2014-2016
Vanessa Logan, 2016–present

References

External links 
 Texas Ballet Theater website

Ballet companies in the United States
1961 establishments in Texas
Performing groups established in 1961
Dance in Texas
Non-profit organizations based in Texas